New Groove is an album by American jazz organist Groove Holmes recorded in 1974 and released on the Groove Merchant label.

Reception 

Allmusic's Matt Collar said: "New Groove is an enjoyable if minor early-'70s soul-jazz outing from organist Richard "Groove" Holmes. Featuring a mix of originals, standards, and pop tunes, the album revolves around Holmes' funky organ chops".

Track listing
All compositions by Richard "Groove" Holmes except where noted.
 "Red Onion" (Manny Albam, Richard "Groove" Holmes) – 3:44
 "No Trouble on the Mountain" (Leon Cook) – 3:57
 "Meditation" (Antônio Carlos Jobim, Newton Mendonça, Norman Gimbel) – 6:11
 "Good Vibrations" – 4:40
 "You've Got It Bad" (Stevie Wonder, Yvonne Wright) – 5:22
 "Chu-Chu" – 5:36
 "How Insensitive" (Jobim, Vinícius de Moraes, Gimbel) – 5:43

Personnel
Groove Holmes – organ
Burt Collins, Jon Faddis, Ernie Royal, Marvin Stamm − trumpet
Eddie Daniels − flute, tenor saxophone, piccolo
Leon Cook, O'Donel Levy − guitar
Bernard Purdie − drums
Kwasi Jayourba – percussion
Manny Albam − arranger

References

Groove Merchant albums
Richard Holmes (organist) albums
1974 albums
Albums arranged by Manny Albam
Albums produced by Sonny Lester